Theodorus Barend Pienaar  (23 November 1888 – 14 November 1960) was a South African rugby union player.

Biography
Pienaar received his schooling in Somerset West and then went to Victoria College in 1907, where he obtained his degree and teacher's diploma.

From 1908 to 1914 he played for Stellenbosch, first as captain of the under–19A and later of the first team. In 1915, as captain, Pienaar helped Malmesbury win the Grand Challenge Cup, the club competition in the Western Province and in 1920 and 1921 he was captain of Caledon.

In 1921, Pienaar was selected as captain for the Springbok team that undertook a tour to Australia and New Zealand for the first time. He was already 32 years old at the time and it was also the first time that a player on an overseas tour becomes captain with his first appearance for a Springbok team. During the tour Pienaar was injured and consequently did not play in any Tests, but he did play 10 tour matches.

Pienaar became South African Selector in 1928 and served on that committee until 1931 when he was elected Manager of Bennie Osler's Springbok team that toured Britain and Ireland in 1931–32.

See also
List of South Africa national rugby union players – Springbok no. 164

References

1888 births
1960 deaths
South African rugby union players
South Africa international rugby union players
Rugby union players from the Western Cape
Rugby union forwards
Western Province (rugby union) players